Kamaras (Καμάρας) is a Greek and Hungarian surname. Notable people with the surname include:

 Aristidis Kamaras (born 1939), Greek football player and lawyer
Giorgos Kamaras (1929-2000), Greek football player
 Georgios Kamaras Stadium
György Kamarás (born 1998), Hungarian football player
Iván Kamarás (born 1972), Hungarian actor

See also
Kamara (disambiguation)

Greek-language surnames
Hungarian-language surnames